The 1984 Texas Longhorns football team represented the University of Texas at Austin in the 1984 NCAA Division I-A football season.  The Longhorns finished the regular season with a 7–3–1 record and lost to Iowa in the Freedom Bowl.

Schedule

Roster
QB Todd Dodge

Game summaries

Auburn

Source: Box score

vs. Penn State

vs. Oklahoma

Source: Gainesville Sun

vs. Iowa (Freedom Bowl)

Source: Box Score

References

Texas
Texas Longhorns football seasons
Texas Longhorns football